Huesca, officially Huesca/Uesca, is a province of northeastern Spain, in northern Aragon. The capital is Huesca.

Positioned just south of the central Pyrenees, Huesca borders France and the French Departments of Haute-Garonne, Pyrénées-Atlantiques and Hautes-Pyrénées. Within Spain, Huesca's neighboring provinces are Navarre, Zaragoza and Lleida.

Geography

The low population density, 14.62/km², has meant that Huesca's lush valleys, rivers, and lofty mountain ranges have remained relatively pristine and unspoiled by progress.

Home to majestic scenery, the tallest mountain in the Pyrenees, the Aneto; eternal glaciers, such as at Monte Perdido; and the National Park of Ordesa and Monte Perdido, rich in flora and protected fauna. Popular with mountaineers, spelunkers, paragliders, and white water rafters it is also a popular snow skiing destination with notable resorts in Candanchú, Formigal, Astún, Panticosa and Cerler.

Lakes
Ibón de Bachimaña Alto
Ibón de Escalar
Ibón de Estanés
Ibón de Tebarray

History
The Romans colonised the province of Huesca, which formed the northern part of Hispania Tarraconensis, and continued to live there well into the 5th century until the arrival of the Visigoths. As a mountainous frontier region, it was difficult to dominate. The northern counties had at one time belonged to the Kingdom of Navarre but split off and managed to stem early Moorish invasions in the Middle Ages by forming alliances between themselves and with the Franks, to become Frankish feudal marches. The imperative of sovereignty, or independence, for the northern border counts, gave rise to the Kingdom of Aragon, which was the precursor to the Empire or Crown of Aragon, and ultimately the Kingdom of Spain.

Administrative divisions
The modern day province comprises 10 comarcas and 202 municipalities. 

The following comarcas having their capital in Huesca Province include municipal terms within Zaragoza Province:

 Bajo Cinca: Mequinenza.
 Hoya de Huesca: Murillo de Gállego and Santa Eulalia de Gállego.
 Jacetania: Artieda, Mianos, Salvatierra de Esca and Sigüés.
 Monegros: La Almolda, Bujaraloz, Farlete, Leciñena, Monegrillo and Perdiguera.

Population
The historical population is given in the following chart:

Language
Spanish is the primary language in the province. However, the local linguistic varieties in the center and north of the province (often called fabla) belong to the Aragonese language, which now survives mainly in the northernmost comarcas, such as the Aragon Valley in Jacetania, the Alto Gallego, Sobrarbe, and Ribagorza, where hitherto landlocked and isolated villages have helped the language to thrive into the 21st century.

In the easternmost areas of the province, varieties of the Catalan language are spoken, with a few transitional dialects difficult to classify as Aragonese or Catalan.

See also
 List of municipalities in Huesca

Notes and references

External links 

Diputación Provincial de Huesca